The 2022 Asian Aerobic Gymnastics Championships were the seventh edition of the Asian Aerobic Gymnastics Championships, and were held in Pattaya, Thailand from September 3 to 5, 2022.

Medal summary

Medal table

References

A
Asian Gymnastics Championships
2022 in Thai sport
International gymnastics competitions hosted by Thailand
Asian Aerobic Gymnastics Championships